Jacopo Ciarmela (born 11 January 1998) is an Italian football player. He plays for Montegiorgio in the Serie D.

Club career
He made his Serie C debut for Fermana on 24 September 2017 in a game against Santarcangelo.

References

External links
 

1998 births
People from Ascoli Piceno
Living people
Italian footballers
Association football midfielders
Ascoli Calcio 1898 F.C. players
Serie C players
Sportspeople from the Province of Ascoli Piceno
Footballers from Marche